Peter John Webley (born 18 July 1942) is a former English cricketer.  Webley was a left-handed batsman who bowled leg breaks and the googly.  He was born in Luton, Bedfordshire.

Webley made his debut for Bedfordshire against Cambridgeshire in the 1967 Minor Counties Championship.  He played Minor counties cricket for Bedfordshire from 1967 to 1975, making 36 Minor Counties Championship appearances. He made his only List A appearance against Essex in the 1971 Gillette Cup. In this match, he scored 4 runs before being dismissed by John Lever, with Essex winning by 97 runs.

References

External links

1942 births
Living people
Cricketers from Luton
English cricketers
Bedfordshire cricketers